FML may refer to:

Computing 
 Face Modeling Language, an XML-based language that describes face animation
 "Fuck my life", an expression of one's frustration, often used in SMS language
 FMyLife, a blog
 Football Manager Live, a video game
 Fuzzy markup language, in computer science, language for implementation-independent specification of a fuzzy system
 Forge Mod Loader, the Mod Loader used by Forge, for Minecraft.

Materials 
 Fiber metal laminate, a material composed of metal layers and composite materials
 Fluorometholone, a corticosteroid

Organisations 
 Fan Milk, a Ghanan ice cream manufacturer
 Feed My Lambs, an American educational charity
 Fiji Muslim League, a religious organization based in Fiji
 Flint Metro League, a high school sports league in the Flint, Michigan area
 Friedrich Miescher Laboratory of the Max Planck Society, a research institute in Tübingen, Germany

Other 
 Feldmarschall-Leutnant (Lieutenant field marshal), a rank in the Austrian and later Austro-Hungarian Army
 FML, station code for Frimley railway station in England
 "FML" (song), song by American rap artist Kanye West